Raffaele Farigu (9 June 1934 – 27 June 2018) was an Italian politician who served as a Deputy from 1987 to 1994.

References

1934 births
2018 deaths
20th-century Italian politicians
Italian Socialist Party politicians
Deputies of Legislature X of Italy
Deputies of Legislature XI of Italy
Members of the Regional Council of Sardinia
People from the Province of Cagliari